Lagardère S.A. is an international group with operations in over 40 countries. It is headquartered in the 16th arrondissement of Paris. The group was created in 1992 as Matra, Hachette & Lagardère. Headed by Arnaud Lagardère, it is focused around two priority divisions: Lagardère Publishing and Lagardère Travel Retail. Their book and electronic publishing division (Lagardère Publishing) includes the major imprint Hachette Livre. The Lagardère Travel Retail unit includes store retail, largely in airports and railway stations. The Group's business scope also comprises other activities, mainly including Lagardère News (Paris Match, Le Journal du Dimanche, Europe 1, Europe 2, RFM and the Elle brand licence) and Lagardère Live Entertainment.

History

Hachette and Matra, the foundation of Lagardère 

The starting point for what would become the Lagardère Group was Louis Hachette's acquisition of Parisian bookstore Brédif in 1826. Hachette published magazines dedicated to public entertainment (Le Journal pour Tous ["Everyone's Newspaper"], 1855) and also took part in publishing the Dictionnaire de la Langue française ("Dictionary of the French Language") with his friend Littré, starting in 1863. In 1953, Hachette launched Le Livre de Poche with Henri Filipacchi.

Created in 1945, Matra (Mechanics/Aviation/Traction) was the company behind several technological projects, including creating a twin-engine aeroplane prototype able to travel at 800 km/h and breaking the sound barrier at Mach 1.4 in vertical flight for the first time in Europe. In 1990, Matra Espace and the aerospace division of Gec Marconi came together to create Matra Marconi Space. Matra Hautes Technologies joined the aerospace industry and officially became Aerospatiale Matra on June 11, 1999. EADS, or the European Aeronautic Defence and Space Company, later Airbus, was founded on July 10, 2000, from the merger of Aérospatiale Matra SA, Aeronautics SA, and DaimlerChrysler Aerospace AG. It officially launched the A380 program that same year. The aircraft would make its first flight in 2005.

Jean-Luc Lagardère and the birth of the group 

In 1963, Jean-Luc Lagardère was appointed Chief Executive Officer of Matra, with 1,450 employees. In 1981, he became head of Hachette. In 1988, the group acquired Grolier Encyclopedias in the USA, its first overseas acquisition. In 1992, after a major year-long restructuring, Matra Hachette and Lagardère group were created. In 1990, Jean-Luc Lagardère turned to television and became head of La Cinq, which had been suffering from financial problems since it began operations in 1986. The network's financial problems would worsen after Lagardère took control, and La Cinq ultimately ceased operations on 12 April 1992 (it would be replaced by France 5 in late 1994).

Arnaud Lagardère and the group's refocus on media 

In 1994, Hachette Livre launched the first multimedia encyclopedia, Axis. Also in 1994, Matra Hachette Multimedia presented EPSIS, the first image-substitution process for advertising. In 1998, Hachette Multimedia was born of the consolidation of the multimedia division of Hachette Livre and Grolier Interactive (online educational services). A strategic agreement signed in 2000 by Lagardère and Deutsche Telekom to provide Internet service led to the merger of T-Online and Club-Internet.

In 1995, Hachette acquired UCS, Canada's leading newsstand chain, and became the third largest operator in the international retail press trade. In 1996, Hachette Livre acquired the Hatier Group. In 1997, Hachette Livre won a string of literary prizes, including the Prix Goncourt and the Prix de l'Académie française with La Bataille (The Battle) by Patrick Rambaud (Grasset). That same year, Europe 1 and Club-Internet launched Europe Info. In 2000, Hachette Distribution Services created Relay, an international brand specializing in selling media products at public points of sale. That same year, Lagardère and Canal+ got into digital television. In 2001, Lagardère acquired the Virgin Stores brand and Virgin Megastore in France. Hachette Filipacchi Médias has continued its growth by taking a 42% stake in the Marie-Claire Group.

From a conglomerate to a media-diversified group 

With the death of Jean-Luc Lagardère on March 14, 2003, Arnaud Lagardère was appointed General Partner of Lagardère SCA. That same year, Lagardère sold off its interest in Renault as well as its automotive engineering business. In 2004, the Group acquired Vivendi Universal Publishing. After antitrust review, Lagardère kept 40% of the company, including the imprints Larousse, Dalloz, Dunod, Nathan, Armand Colin and Sedes, as well as the Spanish division Grupo Anaya. The remainder was sold in 2004 under the name of Editis. Lagardère took advantage of the growth of TNT to launch the youth channel Gulli in partnership with France Télévisions.

In 2006, Arnaud Lagardère created Lagardère Sports, a new subsidiary of the Group specializing in sports economics and sporting rights. Lagardère also became the new franchisee of the Croix-Catelan (Bois de Boulogne, Paris) and the Rue Eblé sports and recreation sites, for a twenty-year period. On May 31, 2010, Lagardère Sports changed its name and became Lagardère Unlimited, a new branch of the group specializing in the sport industry and entertainment.

On July 8, 2015, Lagardère Services was renamed Lagardère Travel Retail. On September 15 of that year, agencies of the Lagardère Group announced that they were being renamed under a common corporate brand: Lagardère Sports and Entertainment. This new brand would replace the brand of Lagardère Unlimited as one of the four divisions of the Lagardère Group. In addition, all sports marketing agencies within this division, including Sportfive, World Sport Group, IEC in Sports, Sports Marketing and Management and Lagardère Unlimited Inc., would be unified under a single commercial brand, Lagardère Sports, with all entertainment businesses under the brand Lagardère Live Entertainment.

2010 shareholders meeting 

Seventeen years after the creation of the limited partnership disputed by an American activist, the SCA (the French limited partnership with shares) was confirmed by nearly 80% of shareholders at the Shareholders Meeting on April 27, 2010.

Agreement between Lagardère SCA and Hearst Corporation 

On March 28, 2011, Lagardère SCA signed a contract to sell its international magazine business, totaling 102 titles, to Hearst Corporation for €651 million. The transaction included a Master License Agreement (MLA) relating to the ELLE trademark in the 15 countries affected by the transfer, in return for which the Group would receive an annual recurring royalty payment. Lagardère would retain complete ownership of its magazine business operations in France and of its ELLE trademark throughout the world. The closing of the transaction remained subject to approval by local partners in certain countries as well as to certain customary governmental approvals and antitrust clearances in certain jurisdictions.

Sale of endurance sports division to WTC 

In January 2016, Lagardère sold the endurance sports division to the World Triathlon Corporation. The transaction included the ITU World Triathlon Series races in Hamburg, Abu Dhabi, Kapstadt, Leeds and Stockholm; other running events like the Hamburg-Marathon, Hawkes Bay International Marathon, Marathon de Bordeaux, Queenstown Marathon and The Music Runs; and cycling events like the Cyclassics Hamburg, Velothon Berlin, Velothon Wales, Velothon Copenhagen, Velothon Stockholm and Velothon Stuttgart.

Recent acquisitions 

Lagardère Publishing acquired Perseus Books (2016), Bookouture (2017), La Plage (2018), Worthy Publishing Group (2018), Gigamic (2019), Blackrock Games (2019) and Short Books (2019). Lagardère Travel Retail completed the acquisitions of Paradies (2015), Hojeij Branded Foods (2018) and International Duty Free (2019).

Sale of most of the media assets and sports agency 

Since the first half of 2018, a plan to sell the Group's media assets (excluding Paris Match, Le Journal du Dimanche, Europe 1, Europe 2, RFM and the Elle brand licence) was underway at Lagardère Active. The Group had already divested a large number of assets, including international radio operations, the main digital assets (including e-Health), and the interest in Marie Claire. In 2019, Lagardère finalised the sale of most of the magazine publishing titles in France, the TV businesses, the stake in Mezzo and Disney Hachette Presse.

The Lagardère group finalized the sale of 75% of Lagardère Sports (excluding Lagardère Live Entertainment) to Hamburg-based private equity firm H.I.G. Capital on April 22, 2020.

In May 2020, the Group resisted a demand for the replacement of most of the board members, submitted by Amber Capital, its new largest shareholder. In August, peer French media conglomerate Vivendi raised its stake in the Group to 23.5%, the highest among all shareholders, including Amber (which raised its own by 2% to 20%). It made a pact with the fund in which the two jointly requested four seats, three for Amber and one for Vivendi, on the board.

In November 2020, Lagardère Studios was sold to Mediawan.

In July 2021, Lagardère Sports was fully divested by the sale of remaining 25% to H.I.G. Capital.

Self censorship
In 2022 the Financial Times reported that the Lagardère Group's Octopus Books had censored references in books to issues seen as sensitive in China, including information about Taiwan. One book had an entire section about Taiwan cut. The censorship was implemented to allow Octopus to continue to use low cost Chinese book printers.

Management 

Until 30 June 2021, the management structure of Lagardère reflects its status as a société en commandite par actions (partnership limited by shares): the firm is led by general and managing partner Arnaud Lagardère, who heads an executive committee comprising two co-managing partners (Pierre Leroy and Thierry Funck-Brentano), spokesperson and chief of external relations Ramzi Khiroun and chief financial officer Sophie Stabile.

Since the conversion of the company into a joint-stock company with a board of directors on 30 June 2021, Arnaud Lagardère was appointed as Chairman and Chief Executive Officer and Pierre Leroy as Deputy Chief Executive Officer.

Each of the company's two main divisions has its own chairman and CEO, with Lagardère Publishing led by Pierre Leroy and Lagardère Travel Retail by Dag Rasmussen.

The company is overseen by a board of directors, which has been chaired by Arnaud Lagardère since July 2021. Its other members are Virginie Banet, Valérie Bernis, Laura Carrere, Fatima Fikree, Marie Flavion (director representing employees), Pascal Jouen (director representing employees), Arnaud Lagardère, Véronique Morali, Arnaud de Puyfontaine, René Ricol, Nicolas Sarkozy and Pierre Leroy (board advisor).

Business lines

Lagardère Publishing
Lagardère Publishing is the world's third-largest trade book publisher for the general public and educational markets, operating under the Hachette Livre imprint. The division is a federation of publishing houses which specialise in education, general literature, illustrated books, part works, dictionaries, youth works, book distribution, etc.

Lagardère Publishing creates 17,000 original publications each year and operates predominantly in the three main language groups: English, French and Spanish.

The division also invested in leisure activities adjacent to the world of publishing with the acquisition of companies specialised in mobile games (Neon Play and Brainbow in 2016) and board games (Gigamic and Blackrock Games in 2019).

Lagardère Travel Retail

Lagardère Travel Retail is involved in Travel Retail (Travel Essentials, Duty Free & Fashion, and Foodservice). Aelia is a subsidiary of Lagardère that manages 270 duty-free shops in France, the United Kingdom, Poland, Ireland and Spain. In 2013, Aelia had sales of over €1,100 million.

At the end of 2013, Lagardère acquired the Dutch company Gerzon, including Gerzon Schiphol, Gerzon Duty Free and Gerzon Import. Gerzon has a long term concession for Fashion, Leather & Travel and has stores at Amsterdam Schiphol Airport, among them Hermes, Burberry, Victoria's Secret, Ralph Lauren and nine multi brands in Fashion and Leather & Travel. From December 1, 2015, Gerzon would become Lagardère Travel Retail the Netherlands.

In 2015, Lagardère Travel Retail acquired The Paradies Shops in North America, signing the agreement in August and completing the acquisition in October. Paradies and Lagardère Travel Retail in North America combined to become Paradies Lagardère.

In 2018, the division acquired Hojeij Branded Foods (HBF), a food service leader in the travel retail market in North America.

In 2019, Lagardère Travel Retail completed acquisition of International Duty Free (IDF), the travel retail market leader in Belgium, which also has operations in Luxembourg and Kenya.

In November 2022, it was announced Lagardère Travel Retail had acquired the Pfäffikon-headquartered multi-brand international catering company Marché International AG - holding company of Marché Group.

Other activities

Lagardère News: Paris Match, Le Journal du Dimanche, Europe 1, Europe 2, RFM and the Elle brand licence.

Lagardère Live Entertainment: venue operation and management (the Folies Bergère, Casino de Paris, Arkéa Arena, Arena du Pays d'Aix), production of concerts and live shows.

Jean-Luc Lagardère Foundation 

Since 1989, the Jean-Luc Lagardère Foundation has encouraged and supported creativity and diversity through partnerships in the spheres of culture, solidarity and sport. Each year, the Foundation awards grants to gifted young people with bold, creative projects in the culture and media world.

It has rewarded young film producers like Carole Scotta (founder of Haut et Court movie company), scriptwriters like Phil Ox (who became a producer in France and England), novel writers like Agnes Desarthe, photographers like Emily Buzin and Tiane Doan Na Champassak and journalists like Stephane Edelson (who wrote in 1993 about the economist and banker Muhammad Yunus and the influence of his work on the empowerment of women).

Financial data 

(*Excluding non-recurring/non-operating items ) / (**Restated for IFRS 15) / (***Restated for IFRS 16).

Lagardère shares are listed at Euronext Paris.

See also

 List of multinational corporations
 List of French companies

References

External links

 Lagardère Publishing/Hachette Livre
 Lagardère Travel Retail
 Jean-Luc Lagardère Foundation
 LS travel retail Asia

 
Conglomerate companies of France
Publishing companies of France
Multinational companies headquartered in France
Companies based in Paris
Companies listed on Euronext Paris
Conglomerate companies established in 1992
French companies established in 1992
G
Mass media in Paris
Announced mergers and acquisitions